also known by his Chinese style name , was an aristocrat-bureaucrat of Ryukyu Kingdom.

Tasato was a younger brother of Kochinda Chōei. He was also a playwright, and known for writing kumi odori. Three plays by Tasato survive today, and are still performed.

References

1703 births
1773 deaths
People of the Ryukyu Kingdom
18th-century Ryukyuan people
Ryukyuan culture
Kumi Odori playwrights